John Trelawny (or Trelawney) (c. 1504 – 29 September 1563) was an Cornish Member of Parliament. The son of Walter and Isabella Trelawny of Poole-in-Menheniot, Cornwall, he was High Sheriff of Cornwall in 1547 and 1560. He represented Liskeard in the first Parliament of 1553 and Cornwall from 1559 until his death. He married twice; his son by his marriage to Margery Lamelion, John, was his heir and also served as High Sheriff.

Notes

References

 Vivian's Visitations of Cornwall (Exeter: William Pollard & Co, 1887) 
 
 Richard Polwhele and John Whitaker, The Civil and Military History of Cornwall  (London: Cadell & Davies, 1806)

1500s births
1563 deaths
Politicians from Cornwall
Members of the pre-1707 English Parliament for constituencies in Cornwall
High Sheriffs of Cornwall
English MPs 1553 (Edward VI)
English MPs 1559
English MPs 1563–1567